Daphne limprichtii is a species in the family Thymelaeaceae.

References

limprichtii